Post Office Passport Seva Kendra abbreviated as POPSK is an Indian government initiative by the Ministry of External Affairs (India) (MEA) and the Department of Posts (DoP), where the Head Post Offices (HPO) and post offices is being utilized as Post Office Passport Seva Kendra (POPSK) for delivery of passport related services to the citizens of India. The purpose of this initiative is to develop passport related services on a bigger scale and to ensure wider area coverage. As of November 2019 a total of 424 POPSKs have been made operational in the country.

History 
Passport Seva Project (PSP) was launched in May 2010 by Ministry of External Affairs under the then External affairs minister  S M Krishna  .

See also 
 List of Passport Offices in India
 Indian passport
 Visa requirements for Indian citizens
 Visa policy of India
 The Passports Act
 Ministry of External Affairs (India)

References

External links 
 Official Website

 Official Website

Modi administration initiatives
Government agencies of India
Ministry of External Affairs (India)
Postal